John Chew Thomas (October 15, 1764 – May 10, 1836) was an American politician who served as a Federalist member of the U.S. House of Representatives for Maryland's 2nd congressional district from 1799 to 1801.  He also served as a member of the Maryland State House of Delegates from 1796 to 1797.

Born in Perryville, Maryland, Thomas attended private schools and graduated from the University of Pennsylvania at Philadelphia in 1783.  He moved to "Fairland" in Anne Arundel County, Maryland, around 1789, studied law, and was admitted to the bar in Philadelphia on December 15, 1787, but did not engage in extensive practice.  He was elected as a Federalist to the Sixth Congress, and served from March 4, 1799, to March 3, 1801, but declined to be a candidate for reelection in 1800.

In 1810, Thomas sold Fairland, freed most of his slaves, and moved to Pennsylvania, where he lived until his death near Leiperville.  He is interred in the Chester Friends Meetinghouse Cemetery in Chester, Pennsylvania.

References

External links

1764 births
1836 deaths
American Quakers
Federalist Party members of the United States House of Representatives from Maryland
People from Cecil County, Maryland
University of Pennsylvania alumni